WUTH-CD, virtual channel 47 (UHF digital channel 22), is a low-power, Class A UniMás-affiliated television station licensed to Hartford, Connecticut, United States, and serving the Hartford–New Haven television market. Owned by Santa Monica, California–based Entravision Communications, it is a sister station to Univision affiliate WUVN (channel 18). The two stations share studios at Constitution Plaza in downtown Hartford and transmitter facilities on Birch Mountain Road in Glastonbury, Connecticut.

History
What would become WUTH-CD was originally a translator for New York City's WXTV, as Hartford originally did not have a separate Univision affiliate. It moved from channel 61 (where it had been W61AH) to channel 47 in 1984 due to the launch of WTIC-TV, and briefly changed its call letters to WXTV-LP in 1995 (before reverting to its translator call of W47AD). Late in 2001, when Entravision bought WHCT to serve as a full-power Univision affiliate, W47AD's call letters were changed to WUTH-CA. The station became a charter affiliate of Telefutura (the predecessor of UniMás) in 2002, and Entravision took over ownership of WUTH later that year.

External links

UniMás network affiliates
UTH-CD
Low-power television stations in the United States